The Class 111 DMUs were based on Class 101/2s,  but with different engines. The only external body difference was on the final batch of cars where a four character headcode box was fitted above the front cab windows, with the destination indicator on top of a reduced height centre window.

History
The first cars built, part of an order for 339 Metro-Camm cars, were 4 power/trailer sets for the LMR Manchester area built in early 1957. One of these was equipped with supercharged Rolls-Royce C6SFLH 230 hp 6-cylinder engines. This was followed by ten 3-car sets comprising DMBS/TSL/DMCL for the NER at Bradford, then a further twenty 3-car sets. The type lasted in service until 1989 when the class was withdrawn.

Technical details
 Coupling Code: Blue Square 
 Transmission: Standard mechanical

Preservation
One car survives, buffet 59575 currently operational at the Great Central Railway. It operates as the centre car between two Class 101 power cars.

Fleet

References

The Railcar Association
Motive Power Recognition: 3 DMUs. Colin J. Marsden
British Railway Pictorial: First Generation DMUs.  Kevin Robertson
British Rail Fleet Survey 8: Diesel Multiple Units- The First Generation.  Brian Haresnape
A Pictorial Record of British Railways Diesel Multiple Units.  Brian Golding

111
Metropolitan Cammell multiple units
Train-related introductions in 1957